The 2016 Ohio Valley Conference women's basketball tournament was held March 2–5 at Nashville Municipal Auditorium in Nashville, Tennessee.

Format
The OVC tournament is an eight-team tournament with the third and fourth seeds receiving a first round bye and the two team receiving byes through to the semifinals.

Seeds

Bracket

See also
2016 Ohio Valley Conference men's basketball tournament

References

External links
2016 OVC Men's & Women's Basketball Championship

Ohio Valley Conference women's basketball tournament
Basketball competitions in Nashville, Tennessee
Women's sports in Tennessee
College sports tournaments in Tennessee
2015–16 Ohio Valley Conference women's basketball season